Kocher–Debré–Semelaigne syndrome is hypothyroidism in infancy or childhood characterised by lower extremity or generalized muscular hypertrophy, myxoedema, short stature and cognitive impairment. The absence of painful spasms and pseudomyotonia differentiates this syndrome from its adult form, which is Hoffmann syndrome.

The syndrome is named after Emil Theodor Kocher, Robert Debré and Georges Semelaigne. Also known as Debré–Semelaigne syndrome or cretinism-muscular hypertrophy, hypothyroid myopathy, hypothyroidism-large muscle syndrome, hypothyreotic muscular hypertrophy in children, infantile myxoedema-muscular hypertrophy, myopathy-myxoedema syndrome, myxoedema-muscular hypertrophy syndrome, myxoedema-myotonic dystrophy syndrome.

Kocher–Debre–Semelaigne syndrome gives the infant a Hercules appearance.

Presentation 
The age at which child presents with KDSS may vary from new born to as late as 11 years of age. This disease is very rare as only less than 10% of children with hypothyroid myopathy develops this condition. Along with features of hypothyroidism the main additional feature is muscle hypertrophy. It can happen in any muscle of the limbs, but commonly affects the proximal muscles giving the typical Hercules appearance. Even though the muscle appears enlarged, it is weak and so the condition is pseudo hypertrophy especially of the calf muscles.

Other features are pseudomyotonia, myokymia, slow tendon reflex, slowed muscle contractions and relaxations, muscle stiffness, proximal muscle weakness and myopathy. The severity of these symptoms are determined by the period of hypothyroidism and the degree of deficiency of thyroid hormones.

EMG is either normal or may show myopathic low amplitude and short motor unit's potential (MUAPS). The enzymes creatine kinase is elevated usually.

Pathophysiology 
The assumed cause of muscle hypertrophy in KDSS is an abnormal metabolism of carbohydrates leading to increased glycogen accumulation and increased mucopolysaccharide deposits in the muscles. Yet another speculation is an excess intra cellular calcium due to ineffective reuptake into the sarcoplasmic reticulum, which causes a sustained contraction and thereby hypertrophy.

In hypothyroidism the fast twitch muscle fiber is converted to slow twitch fiber, causing the slower reflex or hung up reflex. This may occur as a result of reduction in muscle mitochondrial oxidative capacity and beta-adrenergic receptors, as well as the induction of an insulin-resistant state, due to decrease in thyroid hormones.

The causes for muscle weakness is said to be decrease in muscle carnitine, decreased muscle oxidation, expression of a slower ATPase in myosin chain and decreased transport across the cell membrane.

The rigidity associated with congenital hypothyroidism may be due to abnormal development of basal ganglia.

Diagnosis

Treatment 
The muscle hypertrophy and other symptoms are reversible on treatment with levothyroxine.

References

External links 

Syndromes affecting the endocrine system
Syndromes affecting stature